The lac des Joncs (in English: Joncs lake) is a pond marshy located in the municipality of Piopolis, in the Le Granit Regional County Municipality, in Estrie in Quebec, Canada.

Geography 

The pond is located between Lac aux Araignées and Lake Mégantic. Its main tributaries are: the rivière aux Araignées, which crosses the pond, at its exit takes the name of the outlet of Lac des Joncs, and is joined by the Arnold River to the south of Lac Mégantic. Nearly 127 species of birds frequent the surroundings of all the lakes and marshes, in particular the brent geese during migration and the bald eagle, a rare species in Quebec.

References

External links 
 http://procyon.flsh.usherbrooke.ca/atlasestrie/bio/habitat1/txt/txt_mhd_meg.html
 http://www.canards.ca/votre-province/quebec/milieux-humides-dans-votre-region/marais-du-lac-megantic/

Lakes of Estrie
Le Granit Regional County Municipality